The canton of Rocroi is an administrative division of the Ardennes department, northern France. Its borders were modified at the French canton reorganisation which came into effect in March 2015. Its seat is in Rocroi.

It consists of the following communes:

Auge
Auvillers-les-Forges
Blombay
Bourg-Fidèle
Brognon
Le Châtelet-sur-Sormonne
Chilly
Étalle
Éteignières
Fligny
Gué-d'Hossus
Ham-les-Moines
Harcy
Laval-Morency
Lonny
Maubert-Fontaine
Murtin-et-Bogny
La Neuville-aux-Joûtes
Neuville-lez-Beaulieu
Neuville-lès-This
Regniowez
Remilly-les-Pothées
Rimogne
Rocroi
Saint-Marcel
Sévigny-la-Forêt
Signy-le-Petit
Sormonne
Sury
Taillette
Tarzy
This
Tremblois-lès-Rocroi

References

Cantons of Ardennes (department)